Karin Buder (born 28 July 1964) is an Austrian former alpine skier.

Born in Sankt Gallen, Styria, she won the gold medal in slalom at the 1993 Alpine skiing World Championship in Morioka, Japan. She retired immediately afterwards.

In the World Cup she won one slalom race in 1990.

World Cup victories

External links
 

1964 births
Living people
People from Liezen District
Austrian female alpine skiers
Olympic alpine skiers of Austria
Alpine skiers at the 1992 Winter Olympics
Sportspeople from Styria